Tuman Qaisrani is a town and union council of Dera Ghazi Khan District in the Punjab province of Pakistan. The town is part of Tribal Area. It is the northernmost of all the organized Tumans touching the border of Khyber Pakhtunkhwa.

References

Populated places in Dera Ghazi Khan District
Union councils of Dera Ghazi Khan District
Cities and towns in Punjab, Pakistan